Meric or Méric or Meriç may refer to:

Méric
 Méric Casaubon (1599–1671), French-English classical scholar

Meriç

Places and geography
 Meriç (river), Turkish name for the Maritsa which runs through the Balkans
 Meriç, the Turkish name of Mora, Cyprus, a town in Northern Cyprus
 Meriç, Edirne, a town and district of Edirne Province, Turkey

People
 Meriç Banu Yenal (born 1988), Turkish female basketball player
 Meriç Yurdatapan (born 1972), German-Turkish female jazz singer 
 Hurşut Meriç (born 1983), Dutch-Turkish male footballer

See also
 Maritsa (disambiguation)